Harry A. Gampel Pavilion is a 10,167-seat multi-purpose arena in Storrs, Connecticut, United States, on the campus of the University of Connecticut (UConn). The arena opened on January 21, 1990, and is the largest on-campus arena in New England. It was named after industrialist and 1943 UConn graduate Harry A. Gampel, a philanthropist who walked with Martin Luther King Jr., and who donated $1 million for the construction of the arena. Gampel Pavilion is the primary home to the UConn Huskies men's basketball, women's basketball, and women's volleyball teams.

For most of the time since the late 1990s, the men's basketball team has played most of their more important games at the XL Center in Hartford.  During the 2011–12 season, the men's basketball team played 11 home games in Hartford and only eight at Gampel.

The pavilion is the centerpiece of the UConn Sports Center, which also includes Wolff-Zackin Natatorium.

Construction
It replaced the Hugh S. Greer Field House, which only held 4,604 people and still stands to the northwest of the pavilion. The facility has been expanded three times.  As originally constructed, it seated 8,241.  After the 1995–96 season, 1,900 seats were added around the entrances, increasing capacity to 10,027.  A seating adjustment after the 2001–02 season added 140 more seats to result in the current capacity.

In the summer of 2017 a project began to replace the aging roof, which was completed in October 2017. During that time, the volleyball team played some of its fall home games in Greer Field House.

First game
The first basketball game was played on January 27, 1990, between the then 20th-ranked Huskies and the 15th-ranked St. John's Redmen (now Red Storm). UConn won 72–58.

Home court advantage
Since 1990 through 2023 the Huskies men's basketball team has a 218–41 record at Gampel Pavilion.

Source:

International basketball games

Banners
The banners for the men's and women's basketball teams have been taken down and in their place are now large boards on the walls listing the years the teams have made the NIT, NCAA Tournament, Sweet 16, and Elite 8, along with their Big East Regular Season and Tournament Championships.
The National Championship Banners and NIT Championship Banners have been replaced with newer versions, along with banners commemorating Jim Calhoun and Geno Auriemma's Hall of Fame inductions.

Located throughout the concourse of Gampel Pavilion are plaques recognizing the Huskies of Honor, a recognition program that began in 2006 and honors the most significant figures in the history of the UConn basketball programs.

See also
 List of NCAA Division I basketball arenas

References

Basketball venues in Connecticut
College basketball venues in the United States
UConn Huskies basketball venues
Sports venues in Tolland County, Connecticut
University of Connecticut